Maurice Short (born 29 December 1949) is an English former professional footballer who played as a goalkeeper.

References

1949 births
Living people
People from Middlesbrough
English footballers
Association football goalkeepers
Park End F.C. players
Middlesbrough F.C. players
Oldham Athletic A.F.C. players
Grimsby Town F.C. players
Stockton F.C. players
English Football League players